The Association of Professional Genealogists is an organization that promotes professional and business ethics in the field of genealogical research. Organized in 1979, its offices are in Colorado (as of December, 2008).

Membership is open to any person or institution willing to support the organization's objectives and code of ethics. Members include family historians, professional researchers, librarians, archivists, writers, editors, consultants, indexers, instructors, lecturers, columnists, booksellers, publishers, computer specialists, and geneticists.

The goals of the organization are:
 To promote international awareness of, and interest in, professional genealogical services
 To promote professional standards in genealogical research, writing, and speaking
 To engage in activities that improve access to, facilitate research on, and preserve records used in the fields of genealogy and local history
 To promote awareness of activities or laws that may affect genealogical and historical research
 To educate the membership and public through publications and lectures
 To provide support for those engaged in genealogical pursuits as a business

The Association publishes a regular magazine, APG Quarterly, with four or five feature articles in each issue.

A bi-annual Directory is issued, listing the registered genealogists together with short biographies.

References

External links
 APG Official site